The Ministry of Transport and Infrastructure is a government ministry office of the Republic of Turkey, responsible for transport, information and communication services in Turkey. Its head office is in Ankara. The current minister is Adil Karaismailoğlu, in office since March 2020.

Agency and bodies

Central directorates-general and departments 
Directorate-General of Transport Services Regulation (DGTSR)
Directorate-General of Maritime Affairs (DGMA)
Directorate-General of Shipyards and Coastal Structures (DGSCS)
Directorate-General of Communications (DGC)
Directorate-General of Infrastructure Investments (DGII)
Directorate-General of European Union Affairs and Foreign Relations (DGEUFR)
Directorate-General of Legal Services 
Directorate-General of Personnel 
Strategy Development Department 
Inspection Services Department
Directorate of Transport, Maritime Affairs, and Communications Research Center (DoTMCRC)
Directorate of Transport Safety Investigation Center (DoTSIC)
Revolving Funds Department
Information Technologies Department
Support Services Department
Internal Audit Office
Office of Press and Public Relations 
Office of the Private Secretary

Subsidiaries, affiliated and related institutions 
Directorate-General of Highways (DGH)
Directorate-General of Civil Aviation (DGCA)
Directorate-General of Turkish State Railways (DGTSR)
Directorate-General of State Airports Authority (DGSAA)
Directorate-General of Turkish Post Company
Directorate-General of Coastal Safety 
Information Technologies and Communication Authority 
Turksat Satellite Communications and Cable TV Operations Company

References

External links
Official website 

Transport and Infrastructure
Turkey, Transport and Infrastructure
Turkey, Transport and Infrastructure
Transport organizations based in Turkey